André Parmentier may refer to:

 André Parmentier (landscape architect) (1780–1830), American landscape architect
 André Parmentier (politician)
 André Parmentier (sport shooter) (1876–1937), French Olympic sport shooter